Marcius may refer to:

Marcius (family), ancient Romans
Marcius (insect), a genus in family Alydidae

See also 
 Martius (disambiguation)
 Marsyas (disambiguation)